Callionymus io, the Andaman Sea spiny dragonet, is a species of dragonet endemic to the Indian Ocean waters off of Myanmar.  This species grows to a length of  SL.

References 

I
Fish described in 1983
Taxa named by Ronald Fricke